Manfred Donike (23 August 1933, Köttingen, Rhine Province – 21 August 1995, on a flight from Frankfurt am Main to Johannesburg) was a German cyclist and chemist, known for his research on doping. Donike lived in Rölsdorf.

Donike studied chemistry in Cologne and graduated in 1965. By 1972, Donike had developed a procedure capable of accurate detection of banned substances and their metabolites through analysis, using gas chromatography and mass spectrometry, of urine. In 1977, Donike was hired by the German Sport University Cologne to lead the biochemistry department.

In 1960 and 1961 Donike competed in the Tour de France. His son, also called Manfred, competed at the 1984 Summer Olympics.

Donike died of a heart attack on 21 August 1995 in an airplane while en route to Johannesburg, South Africa.

References

1933 births
1995 deaths
People from Erftstadt
Sportspeople from Cologne (region)
People from the Rhine Province
German male cyclists
Drugs in sport
Ben Johnson doping case
20th-century German chemists
Cyclists from North Rhine-Westphalia